Count Stefan Zamoyski (1837–1899) was a Polish nobleman (szlachcic).

Stefan was member of the Sejm in Galicia and owner of Wysocko, Baranów and Kłuszyn estates. He married Zofia Potocka on 24 August 1870 in Krzeszowice. They had five children together: Adam Zdzisław Zamoyski, Władysław Zdzisław Zamoyski, Zygmunt Zamoyski, Zofia Zamoyska, Katarzyna Zamoyska and Wanda Zamoyska

1837 births
1899 deaths
Stefan
Counts of Poland